FC Hoyvík was a Faroese football club, which merged with FF Giza in 2012. The new club was called Giza Hoyvík and later changed its name to FC Hoyvík. This incarnation of FC Hoyvík was previously named ÍF Fram Tórshavn (Tórshavn Forward) and was located in the Hoyvík district, a suburb of the capital Tórshavn, Faroe Islands.

History 
The club was founded on 12 January 1975 as IF Fram Tórshavn, and became the third football club in Tórshavn. HB Tórshavn (1904) and B36 Tórshavn (1936) are the first two. The fourth club in Torshavn came in 1997, Argja Bóltfelag from Argir. As the suburb Argir was incorporated in 1997 in the Municipality of Tórshavn. They were founded 1973.

In 1977, Fram Tórshavn played their first season in 1. deild (now named Effodeildin), but only finished seventh in the league and were relegated that season. Fram have never managed to achieve promotion back into the top flight league since. They are the only Faroese football club in history to have played in first league, down to the fourth league. In late 2008, the club changed its name to FC Hoyvík.
In 2009, FC Hoyvík played their first season under the new name in the 1.Deild of the FSF (second division), after Fram Torshavn won the 2.Deild in the previous season and were promoted to 1. deild. They ended as 7th of 10 teams with 34 points. They got the same result in 2010 with 33 points. In 2011, they ended as number 9 with 26 points and got relegated to 2. deild. FC Hoyvík also had a team in 2. deild that year, and this team got relegated to 3. deild. After the 2011 season, FC Hoyvík and FF Giza (earlier Nólsoyar Ítróttarfelag), which played in the fourth leg (3. deild) decided to join forces and merged into Giza/Hoyvík. In 2012, their team ended as number three in 2. deild with 40 points. TB Tvøroyri II got promoted to 1. deild with 40 points, they had better goal score. B36 Tórshavn II won 2. deild and got promoted together with TB Tvøroyri II.

Honours 
1. deild: 1
1976
2. deild: 2
1989, 2008

References

External links 
FC Hoyvík former website

Defunct football clubs in the Faroe Islands
Hoyvík
1975 establishments in the Faroe Islands